Robert Morris Copeland, Sr. (December 11, 1830 – March 28, 1874) was a landscape architect, town planner and Union Army officer in the American Civil War. Along with his partner H.W.S. Cleveland of the firm Cleveland and Copeland, he is known chiefly for his cemetery plans, most notably Sleepy Hollow Cemetery in Concord, Massachusetts as well as contemporaneous designs around Massachusetts and New England.

Biography

Copeland was born on December 11, 1830, to Benjamin and Julia Fellows Copeland, who lived in Roxbury, Massachusetts.  He attended Harvard College, and opened a Boston-based landscape gardening firm with Horace Cleveland in 1854, which became known as Cleveland and Copeland. 

Copeland died suddenly on March 28, 1874, in Cambridge, Massachusetts. He is buried at his Mount Feake Cemetery in Waltham, Massachusetts. Copeland's house in Belmont still stands within the Beaver Brook Reservation, the first state park in Massachusetts.

Projects

Cemeteries
Sleepy Hollow Cemetery, Concord, Massachusetts 
Mount Feake Cemetery, Waltham, Massachusetts (1859)
Oak Grove Cemetery in Gloucester, Massachusetts

Town, park, and estate plans
Central Park, New York City (entered contest, did not win)
Oak Bluffs, Massachusetts
Ridley Park, Pennsylvania
Armsmear, the Samuel Colt estate, Hartford, Connecticut
Frederick Billings Estate, Woodstock, Vermont

Publications
. Versions of the revised fifth edition (1866) and sixth edition (1867) are also freely available.

References

American urban planners
American landscape and garden designers
1830 births
1874 deaths
People from Roxbury, Boston
Harvard College alumni